Tau Librae, Latinized from τ Librae, is the Bayer designation for a binary star system at the southern edge of the zodiac constellation of Libra. It can be seen with the naked eye, having an apparent visual magnitude of 3.68. The distance to this system is around 367 light years, as determined from an annual parallax shift of 8.89 mas.

Judging by its motion through space and physical properties, this system is a member of the Upper Centaurus–Lupus group of the Scorpius–Centaurus association. It is double-lined spectroscopic binary with an orbital period of just 3.3 days and an eccentricity of 0.28. The primary, component A, is a B-type main sequence star with a stellar classification of B2.5 V. It is estimated to hold more than seven times the mass of the Sun and have over three times the Sun's radius. It is only 31.5 million years old and is spinning relatively rapidly with a projected rotational velocity of 134 km/s. It is a heartbeat star system, with pulsations caused by tidal forces.

The system is emitting an infrared excess, suggesting the presence of a circumstellar disk of material.

References

External links

B-type main-sequence stars
Librae, Tau
Libra (constellation)
Librae, 40
CD-29 11837
139365
076600
5812
Upper Centaurus Lupus
Spectroscopic binaries